Slavica Živković is a politician in Serbia. She has served in the National Assembly of Serbia since 19 July 2018 and in the Assembly of the City of Belgrade since 2012. Živković is a member of the Social Democratic Party of Serbia (SDPS).

Private career
Živković has a master's degree in economics. She lives in the Belgrade municipality of Zemun and is president of the SDPS organization in that community.

Political career
Živković joined the SDPS on its formation in 2008. The party contested the 2012 Belgrade local election on a coalition electoral list led by the Democratic Party. Živković was awarded the fifty-eighth position (out of 110) on the list, which won fifty mandates; some members elected ahead of her did not serve, and she received a mandate for the sitting of the assembly that followed.

After this election (and the concurrent 2012 Serbian parliamentary election), the SDPS ended its alliance with the Democratic Party and formed a new alliance with the Serbian Progressive Party. Živković received the thirty-seventh position on the Progressive-led list in the 2014 Belgrade city assembly election and the seventeenth position in the 2018 city assembly election. The lists won majorities on both occasions, and Živković was re-elected both times.

The SDPS contested the 2016 Serbian parliamentary election on the Progressive Party's Aleksandar Vučić — Future We Believe In list, and Živković received the 240th position (out of 250). This was too low for direct election to be a realistic possibility, and, although the list won a majority victory with 131 mandates, she was not initially elected. She was, however, awarded a mandate by the Republic Electoral Commission on 19 July 2018 as a replacement for Meho Omerović, who had resigned. The SDPS is part of Serbia's coalition government, and she serves as a supporter of the administration.

References

1970 births
Living people
Politicians from Belgrade
21st-century Serbian women politicians
21st-century Serbian politicians
Members of the National Assembly (Serbia)
Members of the City Assembly of Belgrade
Social Democratic Party of Serbia politicians
Women members of the National Assembly (Serbia)